Deputy Financial Secretary is a ministerial position in the Government of Hong Kong, deputising the Financial Secretary. The position was created in 2022 after John Lee took office as Chief Executive.

History 
Deputy Financial Secretary was created by 1945 during the British colonial rule. The position was renamed to Secretary for the Treasury in 1989.

In 2022, John Lee, after being selected as the new Chief Executive, decided to install the position of Deputy Financial Secretary. The position was officially revived on 1 July 2022 after his cabinet took office.

Role 
The Deputy Financial Secretary's primary responsibility is to assist the Financial Secretary in coordinating formulation and implementation of cross-bureaux/departmental policies and supervising the policy bureaux under his charge. The Deputy Financial Secretary also assists the Chief Executive in policy making as a member of the Executive Council and takes charge of specific policy areas or projects as directed by the Chief Executive and the Financial Secretary.

List

Deputy Financial Secretaries, 1945–1989

Deputy Financial Secretaries, 2022–

References 

Positions of the Hong Kong Government